Oran Township is one of twenty townships in Fayette County, Iowa, USA.  As of the 2010 census, its population was 760.

Geography
According to the United States Census Bureau, Oran Township covers an area of 36.66 square miles (94.94 square kilometers); of this, 36.65 square miles (94.91 square kilometers, 99.97 percent) is land and 0.01 square miles (0.03 square kilometers, 0.03 percent) is water.

Cities, towns, villages
 Fairbank (partial)

Unincorporated towns
 Oran at 
(This list is based on USGS data and may include former settlements.)

Adjacent townships
 Fremont Township (north)
 Harlan Township (northeast)
 Jefferson Township (east)
 Hazleton Township, Buchanan County (southeast)
 Fairbank Township, Buchanan County (south)
 Lester Township, Black Hawk County (southwest)
 Franklin Township, Bremer County (west)
 Dayton Township, Bremer County (northwest)

Cemeteries
The township contains these four cemeteries: Fairbank, Immaculate Conception, Oran Township and Oran Township.

Major highways
  Iowa Highway 3

Airports and landing strips
 Oelwein Municipal Airport

School districts
 Oelwein Community School District
 Wapsie Valley Community School District
 West Central Community School District

Political districts
 Iowa's 1st congressional district
 State House District 18
 State House District 23
 State Senate District 12
 State Senate District 9

References
 United States Census Bureau 2008 TIGER/Line Shapefiles
 United States Board on Geographic Names (GNIS)
 United States National Atlas

External links
 US-Counties.com
 City-Data.com

Townships in Fayette County, Iowa
Townships in Iowa